Ladeanlegget is an outdoor sports complex in Trondheim consisting of several football pitches. Ladeanlegget is owned by Freidig SK but is located in the neighborhood of Lade and is the home field of Sportsklubben Trygg/Lade, while Freidig SK is based in the neighborhood of Eberg.

Location 
The complex is located beside City Lade and close to Autronica-hallen, a small indoor sports and conference venue. Access to the complex is through Haakon VII's gate.

The pitches 
Ladeanlegget consists of eight separate football pitches: four turf pitches, three gravel pitches and one artificial turf pitch. Several junior teams use these pitches for their matches, along with SK Trondheims-Ørn which uses the pitches for practice.  Since the artificial turf is heated by buried cables, many teams use it in winter, when other fields are covered in snow or ice.

Skandia Cup 
The Skandia Cup children's football tournament is held at Ladeanlegget, and is the second biggest football cup in Norway, after Norway Cup. Over 400 teams from multiple countries including Denmark, Sweden, and Finland participate in this event.

Other 
Many other events are held at Ladeanlegget. One of them is an annual Rugby tournament in which teams from all over Trondheim compete.

Sports venues in Trondheim